Sir John Marcus Fox MBE (11 June 1927 – 16 March 2002) was a British Conservative Party politician.  He served as the Member of Parliament (MP) for Shipley from 1970 to 1997. He was chairman of the 1922 Committee between 1992 and 1997.

Early life
Fox had a twin sister with whom he attended dancing lessons. At those lessons, he met Betty Boothroyd, later to become the Speaker of the House of Commons. He attended Wheelwright Grammar School for Boys (now a campus of Kirklees College) in Dewsbury.

Fox served in the Duke of Wellington's Regiment as a Lieutenant, a detail which he was sometimes known to mention in after-dinner speeches. Fox left the Army and began his political career with his election to Dewsbury Council in 1956, remaining there until 1963. He then became a bank clerk, a sales manager for Woolworths and for Terry's in York, and then a company director. He unsuccessfully contested the parliamentary seat of Dewsbury in 1959, followed by Huddersfield West in 1966, before eventually being elected for Shipley in 1970.

Parliamentary career
After Fox's election to parliament as the MP for Shipley, he served as a whip under Edward Heath, and then was a junior minister under Margaret Thatcher. He was moved back to the back-benches in 1981, and started ascending the pole to become chairman of the 1922 Committee, becoming vice-chairman in 1983 and chairman in 1994. He received an MBE in 1963 for political services in Yorkshire, was knighted in 1986 for political service, and became a member of the Privy Council in 1996.

Fox lost his seat at the general election in 1997 to Chris Leslie, the Labour candidate. He then retired from politics to his Yorkshire home, where he remained until his death, aged 74.

Personal life
He married Ann Tindall in 1954; they had a son and a daughter.

References

External links
 
 

1927 births
2002 deaths
Chairmen of the 1922 Committee
Green Howards officers
Conservative Party (UK) MPs for English constituencies
Members of the Privy Council of the United Kingdom
Members of the Order of the British Empire
Councillors in Kirklees
People from Dewsbury
UK MPs 1970–1974
UK MPs 1974
UK MPs 1974–1979
UK MPs 1979–1983
UK MPs 1983–1987
UK MPs 1987–1992
UK MPs 1992–1997
Politicians from Bradford
Knights Bachelor
Politicians awarded knighthoods